"Mitä tänne jää" is a song by Finnish rapper Cheek. Released on 5 August 2009, the song serves as the second single from Cheek's fifth studio album Jare Henrik Tiihonen. "Mitä tänne jää" peaked at number 17 on the Finnish Singles Chart. In 2012, Finnish singer Erin reached the number one position on the same chart with her version of the song.

Chart performance

References

Finnish songs
2009 singles
2009 songs
Cheek (rapper) songs